Fire Station No. 7, and variations, may refer to:

Fire Station No. 7 (Denver, Colorado), a Denver Landmark
Fire Station No. 7 (South Bend, Indiana), listed on the National Register of Historic Places (NRHP)
Fire Station No. 7 (Brookline, Massachusetts), NRHP-listed
Pocasset Firehouse No. 7, Fall River, Massachusetts, NRHP-listed
Houston Fire Station No. 7, Houston, TX, NRHP-listed, home of the Houston Fire Museum

See also
List of fire stations